The Race of Champions was a non-championship Formula One motor race held at the Brands Hatch circuit in Kent, United Kingdom between 1965 and 1979, and again in 1983. It often attracted high quality entries from the Formula One World Championship. The first race was won by Mike Spence. The last running of the event was the last non-championship Formula One race (excluding the Formula One Indoor Trophy sprint event) and was won by reigning World Champion Keke Rosberg in a Williams-Cosworth after a tight battle with F1 rookie, American driver Danny Sullivan in a Tyrrell-Cosworth.

Winners of the Race of Champions

By Year 

† Formula 5000 car

External links 

 
Formula One non-championship races

it:Race of Champions